Gaultheria ovatifolia is a species of shrub in the heath family which is known by the common names western teaberry and Oregon spicy wintergreen. It is native to western North America from British Columbia to California, where it grows in high mountain forests. The plant bears small, solitary bell-shaped flowers in shades of white to very light pink with reddish bracts. The flowers hang like tiny bells. The fruit is a red berrylike capsule. It was a food for the Hoh and Quileute of the Pacific Northwest.

See also
Gaultheria humifusa – alpine wintergreen
Gaultheria procumbens – eastern teaberry, checkerberry, boxberry or American wintergreen
Wintergreens

References

External links
Jepson Manual Treatment
Photo gallery

ovalifolia
Flora of British Columbia
Flora of the Western United States
Flora of the United States
Flora without expected TNC conservation status